Capitalist propaganda is promotion of capitalism, often via mass media, education, or other institutions, primarily by the ruling private and political elite. Capitalist propaganda is commonly deployed in capitalist countries to maintain the cultural hegemony of capitalism, by positioning it as the supreme and only valid system, eliminating opposing and dissenting views, and portraying non-capitalist perspectives and countries as comparatively incompetent and inferior, thus reinforcing capitalism as the dominant ideology. Capitalist propaganda may have lasting psychological effects that remain in a population even if the official government of the people is no longer capitalist, which can produce political instability and rebellion. The term capitalist propaganda has been used since at least the early 20th century to describe how propaganda is used by the capitalist class to indoctrinate workers to act against their own interests.

Usage of term 
The Trade Union Unity League, founded in 1929, was targeted in a US government "Investigation of Communist Propaganda" in 1930, in which their objectives and ideologies were outlined as an exhibit or example in their investigation. Within this report, the League used the term capitalist propaganda several times. The Trade Union Unity League dedicated a section to the "Oppression of Negroes" and described how Black Americans were "the most bitterly exploited and oppressed section of the American working class" because they had to accept the worst working conditions and lowest paying jobs in addition to a system of lynching, Jim Crowism, segregation, and political disenfranchisement. The League then wrote how "the standards of living of the working class, despite the tremendous increases in industrial productivity and notwithstanding all the capitalist propaganda to the contrary, tend to decline."

Later in the report, the League describes how the American Federation of Labor worked against the interests of the working class, despite their appearance, because "they sell out and break strikes; they poison the minds of the workers with capitalist propaganda", and they otherwise defend the interests of the capitalist class, despite being a federation of labor unions. Another section on "Against Capitalist Rationalization" described the League's position on rationalization for the ideology of capitalism as follows:
This monstrous system of exploitation is literally consuming the workers in the mad worldwide drive of all capitalist nations for more and more and ever more production at the expense of the workers and for the benefit of the capitalists. Capitalist rationalization profoundly worsens every phase of the workers' life. It inflicts upon the working class vastly increased burdens and hardships of overwork, unemployment, low wages, long hours, sickness, accidents, child labor, super-exploitation of women, driving of old workers out of industry, union disorganization and degeneration, poisonous capitalist propaganda, etc.Acknowledging the historical record, contemporary scholars continue using the term to describe, what Michael J. Vavrus refers to as, a nearly 150-year-long campaign of capitalist propaganda "to demonize political economy alternatives to the dominance of corporate capitalism."

Purposes

Ideological hegemony 

The primary purpose of capitalist propaganda is to maintain ideological hegemony, or the capacity for any ruling class to have their interests be reflected "as the common interest of all members of society, put in an ideal form," so that their interests are universalized as the only valid ones. Philosopher Antonio Gramsci argued that "it is necessary to establish ideological hegemony in order to maintain the continuity of capitalism" and that this is the role of capitalist propaganda. The ruling political and private elite, who control institutions like education and the mass media, exclude and eliminate opposing views, which allows for capitalist propaganda to operate on an almost invisible level in capitalist countries while being enforced at all levels, often going completely unnoticed and unchecked.

In media throughout capitalist countries, such as the United States, "socialist views are excluded from American public discourse" and capitalism is portrayed as an economic system that is simply "equated by definition with political democracy, freedom, and patriotism," writes media studies scholar Donald Lazare. Capitalist propaganda is "reinforced by the mantra that there is no alternative, [which] ensures that any questions concerning (alternative) economic realities are considered as secondary, incidental, indulgent, and ultimately redundant." As scholar Jason Lee describes, "the propaganda of capitalism has worked so well that most people, of the left and the right, find it inconceivable that any other system should exist, and this is the aim of the ideology."

Capitalist propaganda has been determined to be carried out by the private and political elite with the purpose of maintaining their own wealth and power in society. As Guinevere Liberty Nell writes in her analysis of capitalist propaganda and the public discourse, "in a private property economy, the powerful elite are in the private sector; and when it is the private sector that sustains the powerful, it is in their own interest to promote the private property system." Nell describes that capitalist propaganda is "used to support the ideals and norms that are required for, or at least to help bolster, the private property system and the elite's place in it" and that even those who do not intend to engage in the spread of capitalist propaganda may do so because of their conditioning in modern capitalist society.

Techniques

Idealize social mobility under capitalism 
Capitalist propaganda has been identified as promoting individualism through idealizing the conditions of social mobility under the liberal free market or laissez-faire capitalism. Phrases such as "pulling oneself up by the bootstraps" and having the "frontier mentality" promote the idea that going from "rags to riches" through rugged individualism is available to all who work hard enough, or what has otherwise been referred to as the myth of meritocracy. For example, Businessman and television personality Kevin O'Leary described the abject poverty of over 3.5 billion people being equal to the wealth of 85 of the richest people as "fantastic news" since it was "motivation" to become one of "the 1%."

Portray non-capitalist ideologies negatively 
Capitalist propaganda commonly adopts the technique of portraying non-capitalist ideologies negatively. Scholars have identified that capitalist propaganda in Western countries most commonly takes the form of anti-communist or anti-socialist propaganda. Political journalist Anthony Westell identifies a "relentless [campaign of] anti-socialist propaganda by capitalists who feared for their own wealth and power and, conveniently, controlled most of the mass media" in capitalist countries. Czech politician Jiří Hájek described how "socialism is involved in a perpetual war of defence against a capitalist propaganda which operates by means of a well-tried, traditional, psychologically proven system of false myths."

Portray non-capitalist countries negatively

On the Soviet Union 

Following the October Revolution in the Soviet Union, capitalist propaganda was used throughout the United States, Canada, the United Kingdom, and other countries to portray the country and leaders of the revolution negatively to the people. Scholars have identified that this was done largely out of fear that the revolution would inspire similar uprisings in their own countries.

Mike Pell in S. S. Utah, a book banned in 1934, succinctly described capitalist propaganda as follows: "When Camels advertise their cigarettes, that's propaganda to get you to smoke Camels. When you go to the movies in the States and see the gobs having a hell of a good time, that's propaganda to get you to join the Navy. When you read the capitalist press telling you how rotten the Soviet Union is, that's capitalist propaganda to steam you up against the Soviet Union. Get the point?"

In Canada, Tim Buck identified how the Canadian elite used capitalist propaganda in the wake of the October Revolution to portray the Soviet Union negatively to the Canadian people. Buck writes that "the capitalist press distorted the meaning of the nationalization of banks and industries and referred to those great democratic reforms as 'the work of criminals.'" Buck writes how "many workers and farmers were influenced but many among them were shocked by the rabid anti-Soviet propaganda in sermons that they listened to in church." For example, one Roman Catholic bishop portrayed Vladimir Lenin as a "physical personification of the devil," which was reported on as if it were fact in newspapers. Buck describes how Lenin was also portrayed by the Canadian elite as an agent of the German Empire: "capitalist propaganda was directed very largely at confusing and intimidating people by the lying pretense that Lenin was 'a German agent' whose purpose was to deliver Russia into the hands of the German imperialists." For instance, the Toronto Telegram reported that "the Red Flag of the Russian Revolution is prostituted into service as the ensign of German tyranny." The Canadian Tory and federal government also implemented measures to suppress workers organizations, freedom of association, and freedom of speech.

Promote capitalism as superior 
Capitalist propaganda has adopted the technique of portraying capitalism or the free market system as superior. This technique is frequently paired with the condemnation of opposing and dissenting views. Supreme Court justice Lewis F. Powell Jr. argued "for free enterprise education in television, radio, and other media" in order to "sell" the idea of laissez-faire capitalism to the masses. Powell advocated for the entire restructuring of organizations, branches of government, and the general culture in order to accommodate the interests of capitalists. He simultaneously criticized "the social science faculties" on university campuses throughout the United States while encouraging the need to rewrite textbooks and expand conservative "think tanks" in order to promote capitalism, a project already undertaken by Leonard Read, who founded the Foundation for Economic Education in 1946. As described by scholar Lawrence B. Glickman, "selling [free market capitalism] meant telling (highlighting the virtues of free enterprise), but it also meant yelling (condemning those out to undermine it). Indeed the two could not be separated since critics always seemed to be gaining ground."

In the United Kingdom, high unemployment in the wake of the October Revolution concerned the British elite, who were anxious to avoid a repeat of the Russian Revolution in their own country and a turn to communism. Material was sent to the Economic League, a non-governmental organization dedicated to the surveillance of anti-capitalist activity, stating that "what is required is some years of propaganda for capitalism as the finest system that human ingenuity can devise." The League responded by placing numerous articles in newspapers, paying journalists to write them, and funding speakers, who they referred to as "big men in ever sense of the word," to talk to the British public about economics in simplistic terms.

Promote capitalism as the only viable option 
Scholars Richard J. White and Colin C. Williams state, "at a time of global neoliberal economic, environmental and political crisis, capitalism is presented as society's least worst option" through propaganda. Professor Stephen Duncombe writes "the powers that be do not sustain their legitimacy by convincing people that the current system is The Answer. That fiction would be too difficult to sustain in the face of so much evidence to the contrary. What they must do, and what they have always done very effectively, is convince the mass of people that there is no alternative."

Means

Mass media and entertainment 
The mass media has been commonly described as the most pervasive avenue of distribution for capitalist propaganda. Advertising has been referred to by cultural theorist Raymond Williams as "the official art of modern capitalist society: it is what 'we' put up in 'our' streets and use to fill up to half of 'our' newspapers and magazines: and it commands the services of perhaps the largest organized body of writers and artists, with their attendant managers and supervisors, in the whole society."

Writers such as Ariel Dorfman and Armand Mattelart in How to Read Donald Duck and Michael Real in Mass-Mediated Culture demonstrate the pervasiveness of capitalist propaganda in mass media such as Disney comics and entertainment venues like Disneyland. Media studies scholars have analyzed how capitalist propaganda in the media and entertainment sectors often goes completely unidentified. Donald Lazare questions, while a fictional "communist version of Disneyland" or an "American socialist television newscast might cause readers to snicker at what they perceive to be blatant propaganda" for socialism, "is it not an indication of how indoctrinated we have been that we do not recognize the real Disneyland or commercialized newscasts as equally blatant propaganda for capitalism?"

Television 
Television has been identified as a major source of capitalist propaganda among existing scholarship and studies. As scholar Guinevere Liberty Nell writes, "the private propaganda of capitalist firms can be seen in many forms of media, including television." Shows such as The Price is Right and Undercover Boss have been identified as programs which visibly perpetuate a capitalist worldview. On the latter, Nell writes that "the show at first might appear to be a positive force upon corporate culture, bringing workers' needs to the attention of the management; actually, it promotes a submissive attitude of workers to management, and focuses on the productivity (and pride) of the workers in much the same way as the Soviet propaganda promoting 'Stakhanovites.'"

Institutions such as the Advertising Council of the United States have been identified as "a propaganda agency for corporate capitalism" because of its work in implicitly upholding capitalism despite claiming to be "non-commercial, non-denominational, non-partisan politically, and not designed to influence legislation." It has been estimated that American children receive over 350,000 propaganda messages for capitalism in television commercials alone by the time they are eighteen.

Museums and the art establishment 
Although they appear as "neutral" institutions in capitalist countries, art museums and other museums have been designed to uphold the ideological beliefs of the elite or capitalist class. Museum studies scholar Nicolas Lampert analyzes how museums in capitalist countries form, what he terms, a Museum-Industrial complex. Organizations such as the Guerilla Art Action Group (GAAG) have protested museums such as the Museum of Modern Art (MOMA), where they removed Kazimir Malevich's Supremacist Composition: White on White from the wall, with no intention to harm the work but rather selecting it as a "symbolic site to present [a] manifesto." The manifesto demanded that MOMA "decentralize its power structure" and stated that if art is "to have any relevance at all today, [it] must be taken out of the hands of an elite and returned to the people." The manifesto further described how the art establishment (1) represses and manipulates artists to primarily create and say only what is "for the benefit of an elite," (2) encourages people to accept or distracts them from their repression by the military/business complex, and (3) functions "as propaganda for capitalism and imperialism all over the world."

National organizations 
National organizations that promote capitalist propaganda and monitor anti-capitalist activity by suppressing people who oppose capitalism exist to maintain the ideological hegemony of capitalism in capitalist countries. These organizations are often explicitly founded by and/or receive heavy financial backing and support from the elite, who use them to spread capitalist propaganda and discourage dissent. The Economic League was a non-governmental organization (NGO) in the United Kingdom dedicated to surveying and opposing all anti-capitalist activity as well as funding capitalist propaganda. The organization kept a blacklist of anti-capitalists for decades which it passed on to corporate members who used it to vet job applicants and deny people jobs based on their anti-capitalist ideological perspectives.

References 

Propaganda
Capitalism